The 2012 7s Premier League (also known as the NBM 7s Premier League for sponsorship reasons) was the first edition of the 7s Premier League tournament and was held at Outeniqua Park, George on 14 and 15 December 2012.

Format
The teams will be divided into four pools of three teams. On Day 1, each team in Pool A and Pool B will play cross-conference games against the three teams in the other pool. Similarly, each team in Pool C and Pool D will play cross-conference games against the three teams in the other pool.

The top two teams in each pool will qualify for the Cup Quarter Finals and the bottom team in each pool will qualify for the Bowl Semi-Finals. The winners of the Cup Quarter Finals will advance to the Cup Semi-Finals, while the losers of the quarter finals will advance to the Plate Semi-Finals. In the Cup, Plate and Bowl Semi-Finals, the winners will advance to the Final, while the losers will advance to the 3rd-place play-off.

Pools

Pool A

Log

Pool B

Log

Pool C

Log

Pool D

Log

Fixtures and results

Pool A v B

Round one

Round two

Round three

Pool C v D

Round one

Round two

Round three

Cup

Quarter-finals
The four Cup Quarter Final winners will advance to the Cup Semi-Finals.  The four losers will advance to the Plate Semi-Finals.

Semi-finals

3rd-place play-off

Final

Plate

Semi-finals

3rd-place play-off

Final

Bowl

Semi-finals

3rd-place play-off

Final

Final classification

Teams and Players
The participating teams were:

References

External links
Official Site

7s Premier League
2012 rugby sevens competitions
2012 in South African rugby union